Washington Township is a township in Pottawattamie County, Iowa, USA.

History
Washington Township was organized in 1870.

References

Townships in Pottawattamie County, Iowa
Townships in Iowa